Mae Hong Son is a town (thesaban mueang) in north-west Thailand, capital of Mae Hong Son Province. It is in the Shan Hills, near the border with Burma along the banks of the River Pai. As of 2018, the town had 7,066 inhabitants. The town covers the tambon Chong Kham of the Mueang Mae Hong Son district.

History
The territory of Mae Hong Son Province was formerly part of Mawkmai State, one of the Shan States which had been founded in 1767 by Hsai Khiao, hailing from a noble family of Chiang Mai.

As a result of the Anglo-Siamese Boundary Commission of 1892-93 Mae Hong Son district was ceded to Siam,  but the adjacent Möngmaü and Mehsakun trans-Salween districts— also claimed by Siam as territories located on the eastern side of the Salween River— were kept as part of British Burma.

Climate
Mae Hong Son has a tropical savanna climate (Köppen climate classification Aw). Winters are dry and warm. The monsoon season runs from May through October, with heavy rain and somewhat cooler temperatures during the day, although nights remain warm. Mae Hong Son holds the highest temperature ever recorded in Thailand when  was observed on 28 April 2016.

Temperature

Transportation 
Mae Hong Son can be reached by car or bus from Chiang Mai by the Mae Hong Son loop. The town is also serviced by the Mae Hong Son Airport. It is also home to the only commercial Diesel power station in Thailand. The station has only a very small capacity of 4.40 MW (4,400 kW). It seems like it was placed here because of the remote location of the town.

Tourism 
The town has some tourist infrastructure, including many guesthouses and several internet cafes.  It also has a vegetarian restaurant near the main market.

It is a popular jumping-off point for tours to visit hill tribe villages, caves, and waterfalls in the area.  There are also some hot springs nearby.

"Thung Dok Bua Tong" in Amphoe Khun Yuam, where the fields of wild sunflowers bloom and cover the hills during the month of November, is best reached from Mae Hong Son and lies some 80 km away.

References

External links 

Royal Folk Arts and Crafts Training Center Mae Hong Son

 
Populated places in Mae Hong Son province
Cities and towns in Thailand